Argyrades is a village and a community in the southern part of the island of Corfu, Greece. It was the seat of the municipality of Korissia. In 2011 its population was 660 for the village and 1,719 for the community, which includes the villages Agios Georgios (pop. 503), Marathias (pop. 331) and Neochoraki (pop. 225).  Argyrades is situated in low hills, 4 km east of the Korissia Lagoon. It is 4 km northwest of Perivoli, 8 km west of Lefkimmi and 22 km south of the city of Corfu. The Greek National Road 25 (Corfu - Lefkimmi) passes through the village.

Population

See also

List of settlements in the Corfu regional unit

References

External links
 Argyrades at the GTP Travel Pages

Populated places in Corfu (regional unit)